Agdistis dicksoni is a moth in the family Pterophoridae. It is known from South Africa (Western and Northern Cape).

The wingspan is 18–21 mm. The forewings are grey with four dark dots, found in the discal area, at the costal margin, in the middle part and at the wing base. The costal margin is visibly paler. The hindwings are uniformly grey. Adults are on wing from June to December.

Etymology
The species is named after Dr C.G.C. Dickson, a famous lepidopterologist.

References

Endemic moths of South Africa
Agdistinae
Moths of Africa
Plume moths of Africa
Moths described in 2009